Swedish Lutheran Parsonage is a historic church parsonage at 230 Kane Street Wilcox in Jones Township, Elk County, Pennsylvania.  It was built in 1901 in the Queen Anne style.

It was added to the National Register of Historic Places in 2005.

References

Properties of religious function on the National Register of Historic Places in Pennsylvania
Queen Anne architecture in Pennsylvania
Houses completed in 1901
Houses in Elk County, Pennsylvania
Swedish-American culture in Pennsylvania
Clergy houses in the United States
National Register of Historic Places in Elk County, Pennsylvania